Greenwich is a district of London, England, and home of the Greenwich meridian.  The name is often used as a metonym for the prime meridian.

Greenwich may also refer to:

Places

Canada
 Greenwich Parish, New Brunswick
 Greenwich Hill, New Brunswick, an unincorporated community
 Greenwich, Nova Scotia, a rural community
 Greenwich, Prince Edward Island, an unincorporated community

England
 Royal Borough of Greenwich, a current local government district
 Greenwich District (Metropolis), a former local government district, 1855–1900
 Metropolitan Borough of Greenwich, a former local government district, 1900–1965
 Greenwich (London County Council constituency), a former local government constituency, 1919–1965
 Greenwich (UK Parliament constituency), a former constituency, 1832–1997
 Greenwich, Ipswich, Suffolk, England, a suburb of Ipswich
 Greenwich, Wiltshire

United States
 Greenwich, California, former name of Tehachapi, California
 Greenwich, Connecticut, a town
 Greenwich (CDP), Connecticut, a census-designated place
 Greenwich, Illinois, an unincorporated community
 Greenwich, Kansas, an unincorporated community
 Greenwich, Massachusetts, a defunct town
 Greenwich Township, Cumberland County, New Jersey
 Greenwich (CDP), Cumberland County, New Jersey
 Greenwich Township, Gloucester County, New Jersey
 Greenwich Township, Warren County, New Jersey
 Greenwich (CDP), Warren County, New Jersey
 New York:
 Greenwich Village
 Greenwich (town), New York
 Greenwich (village), New York, mostly within the town of Greenwich
 Greenwich, Ohio, a village
 Greenwich Township, Pennsylvania
 Greenwich, Utah, an unincorporated community
 Greenwich, Virginia, an unincorporated community
 Greenwich Bay (Rhode Island)
 Greenwich Bay, at the mouth of the Yarra River in Newport, Victoria

Elsewhere
 Greenwich Island, Antarctica, part of the South Shetland Islands
 Greenwich, New South Wales, Australia, a suburb of Sydney
 Greenwich, Maribor, Slovenia, a neighbourhood of Maribor and Hatchung
 2830 Greenwich, an asteroid

People
 Greenwich (surname)

Schools
 University of Greenwich, London, United Kingdom
 Greenwich University, Karachi, Pakistan, a private research university
 Greenwich University (Norfolk Island), a defunct, controversial distance learning institution
 Greenwich Community College, Greenwich, London
 Ark Greenwich Free School, Greenwich, London, a coeducational secondary free school
 Greenwich High School, Connecticut, United States
 Greenwich Academy, an all-girls day school in Connecticut, United States

Ships
 , six Royal Navy ships
 Greenwich (ship), various ships

Transportation
 Greenwich Avenue, Greenwich Village, New York, United States
 Greenwich Street, Manhattan, New York, United States
 Greenwich station, London, England, a railway station
 Greenwich station (Metro-North), Greenwich, Connecticut, United States, a commuter rail stop

Businesses
 Greenwich Pizza, a large pizza chain in the Philippines
 RBS Greenwich Capital, investment firm now known as RBS Securities
 Greenwich Entertainment, an American film company

Other uses
 Baron Greenwich, two titles, one extinct in the Peerage of Great Britain, one extant in the Peerage of the United Kingdom
 Greenwich (soil), the official state soil of Delaware, United States

See also
Greenwitch, a fantasy novel by Susan Cooper